Michael Brim (January 23, 1966 in Danville, Virginia – April 19, 2005 in Richmond, Virginia)  was a  cornerback who played eight seasons in the National Football League.  Brim attended Virginia Union University, a historically black college that was Division II.

Death
Brim was killed on April 19, 2005, in Richmond, Virginia in a shootout with another man following an argument about a woman.

References

1966 births
2005 deaths
American football cornerbacks
Cincinnati Bengals players
Deaths by firearm in Virginia
Detroit Lions players
Minnesota Vikings players
New York Jets players
Phoenix Cardinals players
Players of American football from Virginia
Sportspeople from Danville, Virginia
Virginia Union Panthers football players
Virginia Union University alumni